Mauvaise Conduite or Improper Conduct is a 1984 documentary film directed by Néstor Almendros and Orlando Jiménez Leal.  The documentary interviews Cuban refugees to explore the Cuban government's imprisonment of homosexuals, political dissidents, and Jehovah's Witnesses into forced-labor camps under its policy of Military Units to Aid Production (UMAP). The documentary was produced with the support of French television Antenne 2 and won the Best Documentary Audience Award at the 1984 San Francisco International Lesbian and Gay Film Festival.

See also
 LGBT rights in Cuba

References

External links
 

1984 films
Documentary films about LGBT topics
Cuban LGBT-related films
1984 documentary films
French documentary films
Documentary films about Cuba
Documentary films about human rights
Human rights abuses in Cuba
1984 LGBT-related films
Works about the Cuban Revolution
Films produced by Barbet Schroeder
Films produced by Margaret Ménégoz
1980s French films